Fistulobalanus albicostatus is a species of barnacle in the family Balanidae.

References

Barnacles
Crustaceans described in 1916
Taxa named by Henry Augustus Pilsbry